Martín Raúl Acosta y Lara Díaz (25 March 1925 – 5 January 2005) was a Uruguayan basketball player who competed in the 1948 Summer Olympics and in the 1952 Summer Olympics.

He was born in Montevideo, Uruguay.

Acosta y Lara was part of the Uruguayan basketball team, which finished fifth in the 1948 tournament.

Four years later Acosta y Lara was a member of the Uruguayan team, which won the bronze medal. He played seven matches.

He died on 5 January 2005 in Mendoza, Argentina and is buried at Cementerio del Buceo, Montevideo.

References

External links

1925 births
2005 deaths
Basketball players at the 1948 Summer Olympics
Basketball players at the 1952 Summer Olympics
Olympic basketball players of Uruguay
Olympic bronze medalists for Uruguay
Uruguayan men's basketball players
Uruguayan people of Spanish descent
Olympic medalists in basketball
Burials at Cementerio del Buceo, Montevideo
Medalists at the 1952 Summer Olympics
1954 FIBA World Championship players